Adolphe Hoffmann (1889-1967) was a French entomologist. From 1950 he was considered the European specialist in the families Curculionidae , Bruchidae and Scolytidae.He was a Member of the Entomological Society of France . His collection of beetles is today at the National Museum of Natural History, France in Paris.

Works
Faune de France Volume n° 44 - Coléoptères Bruchides et Anthribides,  1945
Faune de France Volume n° 52- Coléoptères Curculionides. 1re partie. 1950, 486 p.
Faune de France Volume n° 59- Coléoptères Curculionides. 2e partie. 1954
Faune de France Volume n° 62 - Coléoptères Curculionides. 3e|partie. 1958, 632 p. (réimpression 1999)

See also
:fr:Aphodius arvernicus

References

French entomologists
1967 deaths
1889 births
20th-century French zoologists